Botryphallus is a genus of minute sea snails, marine gastropod mollusks or micromollusks in the family Rissoidae.

Species
Species within the genus Botryphallus include:

 Botryphallus epidauricus (Brusina, 1866)
 Botryphallus ovummuscae (Gofas, 1990)
 Botryphallus tuber (Rolán, 1991)

References

Rissoidae